Brian Edward Sandoval (born August 5, 1963) is an American politician, academic administrator, and former federal judge who served as the 29th Governor of Nevada from 2011 to 2019.

A graduate of the University of Nevada, Reno, Sandoval began his political career in the early 1990s. In 1998 he was appointed to be a member of the Nevada Gaming Commission and later served as the Commission's chairman from 1999 to 2001. A Republican, Sandoval ran and won the position of Nevada Attorney General and served from 2003 to 2005. From 2005 to 2009, he served as judge of the United States District Court for the District of Nevada. 

Sandoval ran for governor in 2010. He defeated incumbent governor Jim Gibbons for the Republican nomination and later defeated Democratic nominee Rory Reid in the general election. He was re-elected in 2014, defeating Democrat Bob Goodman in the state's largest electoral landslide. Sandoval was barred by term limits from running for a third term in 2018. He was succeeded by Democrat Steve Sisolak.

Since October 2020, Sandoval has served as the 17th president of the University of Nevada, Reno.

Early life and education
Sandoval was born in Redding, California, to Ron Sandoval (an FAA maintenance supervisor) and his wife Gloria (Gallegos) Sandoval (a legal secretary). A long-time resident of Reno, Sandoval is of Hispanic ancestry. Sandoval attended Reno's Little Flower School and graduated from Bishop Manogue High School in Reno in 1981; he attended the University of Nevada, Reno, where he was a member of Sigma Alpha Epsilon fraternity. He earned a Bachelor of Arts degree in English and economics in 1986. He then went on to earn a Juris Doctor from the Ohio State University Moritz College of Law in 1989.

Early career 
Sandoval passed the Nevada and California bar exams and entered private practice with several Reno law firms. In 1999, he opened his own law firm in Reno.

Nevada Assembly

Elections
When incumbent Republican Jim Gibbons decided to retire to run for Governor of Nevada in 1994, Sandoval ran for the Reno-based 25th District of the Nevada Assembly. He won the open seat and won re-election in 1996. After he resigned from his seat in 1998, Gibbons' wife Dawn won the open seat.

Tenure
Sandoval sponsored 14 bills that became law—including some that prevented felons from suing victims if they are injured committing a crime, increased the penalties for operating a boat under the influence, and allowed indigent defendants to perform community service to defray their legal costs.

Committee assignments
Sandoval served on the Judiciary, Taxation and Natural Resources Committees. He also served on the Wisconsin Legislative Commission, the Advisory Commission on Sentencing, the Juvenile Justice Commission, the Advisory Council on Community Notification of Sex Offenders, and the Tahoe Regional Planning Agency Oversight Committee.

Gaming Commission of Nevada
In 1998, Sandoval was appointed to serve as a member of the Gaming Commission of Nevada, which oversees the state's gaming industry. The following year, at the age of 35, Sandoval became the youngest person ever to serve as chairman of the gaming commission. During his time on the commission, Sandoval fought national efforts to block gambling on college sports events, worked on regulations limiting neighborhood gaming and worked for regulations prohibiting slot machines with themes attractive to children.

Attorney General of Nevada

2002 election
Sandoval announced his bid on October 11, 2001, to succeed three-term Democrat Frankie Sue Del Papa who was not eligible to run for re–election as Attorney General of Nevada due to lifetime term limits established by the Nevada Constitution in 1996. His primary major party opposition was Democratic attorney John Hunt from Las Vegas, whom Sandoval defeated by a margin of 58.32% to 33.63% on November 5, 2002. Sandoval took office on January 6, 2003.

Tenure
While Attorney General, Sandoval led the state's legal fight against the storage of nuclear waste at Yucca Mountain, developed Nevada's first Public Integrity Unit and sponsored legislation strengthening Nevada's laws against domestic violence, drug abuse and human trafficking.

As attorney general, Sandoval was also the chairman and a member of several state boards and commissions, including the Nevada Boards of Pardons, Prisons, Transportation, and Examiners; the Cyber-Crime Task Force; the Committee on Domestic Violence, and the Prosecutorial Advisory Council.

Federal district judge

Nomination
In the fall of 2004, Democratic Senator Harry Reid spoke with Sandoval about whether he was interested in serving as a judge for the United States District Court for the District of Nevada, and that December, Reid recommended to President George W. Bush that he nominate Sandoval to a future opening on that court. Sandoval was formally nominated by Bush on March 1, 2005, to the seat being vacated by Judge Howard D. McKibben.

On September 29, 2005, the Senate Judiciary Committee held a confirmation hearing on Sandoval's nomination. On October 20, 2005, the Judiciary committee reported Sandoval's nomination out of committee on a voice vote. Sandoval was unanimously confirmed by the Senate on October 24, 2005, by a vote of 89–0 (with 11 Senators not voting). Sandoval then received his judicial commission on October 26, 2005.

Tenure
Sandoval announced his resignation as Judge of the United States District Court for the District of Nevada on August 15, 2009, to become effective beginning September 15, 2009. On the same day as his resignation became official, Sandoval announced he was running for the Governorship. Sandoval's chambers were in the Bruce R. Thompson Courthouse and Federal Building in Reno.

Governor of Nevada

2010 election

On June 9, 2010, on the Republican primary, Sandoval defeated incumbent Governor Jim Gibbons. In the general election, Sandoval won 53%–41%, against Democrat Rory Reid, the Clark County Commissioner and son of U.S. Senate Majority Leader Harry Reid. He won every county in the state, and all with a majority except Clark County, where Las Vegas is the county seat, which Sandoval won with a plurality (49%–47%).

2014 election

Sandoval ran for re-election in 2014. He won the Republican primary with 90% of the vote. In the general election, Sandoval defeated Democrat Bob Goodman with over 70% of the vote.

Tenure

Sandoval, as the state's 29th Governor, proposed a $5.8 billion 2011 budget without any new taxes. It could cause as many as 361 layoffs and 5% pay reductions for state workers. It also included a 5% cut in primary education and 7% cut in higher education. Sandoval turned down a pay raise that would have increased his salary from $141,000 to $149,573 per year. He also has said he will take a 5% pay cut to coincide with every other state worker's.

The final budget for 2011 avoided deep cuts to education and human services programs. It contained a number of reforms that include ending teacher tenure as well as the practice of deciding layoffs based solely on teacher seniority, allowing local governments to re-open employee contracts during financial emergencies as well as barring collective bargaining by supervisors, and eliminating retirement health insurance for new state employees hired after January 1, 2012.

He appointed U.S. Congressman Dean Heller (R–Carson City) to become U.S. Senator, after the seat become vacant from the resignation of John Ensign.

On September 11, 2014, Sandoval signed a package bill to provide $1.3 billion in tax breaks and subsidies over 20 years for Tesla Motors in exchange for building the massive Gigafactory 1 battery factory in the state, near Reno. The factory is key to Nevada's efforts to revitalize its economy, which was hard-hit by the mortgage meltdown and the Great Recession, and has yet to fully recover. 
In June 2015, Sandoval signed several bills designed to overhaul Nevada's education system. The reforms substantially increased funding for public schools and grants, and created incentives to recruit more teachers and promote professional training. $10 million were appropriated for preschool programs and an expansion of full-day kindergarten across Nevada.

Sandoval is widely regarded as a moderate Republican, supporting abortion, Obamacare, immigration reform, and renewable energy. Sandoval was suggested by Senator Harry Reid as a potential nominee to fill the seat of deceased Supreme Court Justice Antonin Scalia, given his judicial experience as well as his moderate reputation; however, Sandoval quickly withdrew himself from consideration.

On March 21, 2016, Sandoval met with Mark Davis, owner of the NFL's Oakland Raiders, about moving the Raiders to Las Vegas, Nevada. On October 14, 2016, Sandoval signed a bill that would provide $750 million in public funding for Allegiant Stadium which would open four years for the Raiders and the UNLV Rebels football program.

On July 12, 2016, Sandoval launched a comprehensive review of Nevada's juvenile justice system and established the Statewide Juvenile Justice Improvement Task Force. Nevada was selected to receive technical assistance from The Council of State Governments (CSG) Justice Center through a grant from the U.S. Department of Justice's Office of Juvenile Justice and Delinquency Prevention. Following the launch, the CSG Justice Center conducted an analysis of the state's juvenile justice system and made recommendations to the task force based on its assessment.

On May 17, 2017, Sandoval signed Senate Bill 201, which would ban psychotherapists from performing conversion therapy on minors.

Solar issues
 

Sandoval came under criticism in 2015 by the rooftop solar industry in Nevada after claims that the Governor failed to act on a statewide net energy metering cap of 235MW. The cap stirred controversy due to its ability to negatively affect the future of the largely successful solar industry in Nevada, specifically related to the loss of thousands of in-state jobs. A statewide study conducted by the Public Utilities Commission of Nevada previously deemed net metering a benefit to all ratepayers.

At the end of July 2015, NV Energy proposed new rates for rooftop solar users. NV Energy specifically states in its proposal that the new rates could eliminate all savings for solar customers.

On August 20, 2015, the controversial 235 MW net metering cap was hit. Immediately before the cap was hit, Vivint Solar pulled out of the state only two weeks after entering. This resulted in lay-offs of many recently hired Nevadans, signaling the future of the industry in Nevada without net metering.

In December 2015, a solar company operating in Nevada filed a lawsuit against Governor Brian Sandoval to compel the release of public records the Governor's office withheld. The withheld public records included text messages between the Governor and his staff with NV Energy's lobbyists. The company claims that the public has the right to know the impact those relationships have had on critical policy decisions, including the rooftop solar debate.

On December 22, 2015, Sandoval's Public Utilities Commission of Nevada, composed of Chairman Paul Thomsen, Commissioner David Noble and Commissioner Alaina Burtenshaw, voted to eliminate the state's net metering policy for rooftop solar. The aftermath of the decision resulted in widespread layoffs in the state and an outpouring of consumer backlash due to the direct penalization of current and future solar customers.

President of University of Nevada, Reno 
On September 17, 2020, Sandoval was named as UNR's 17th president (following Marc Johnson). He is considered an unusual choice because his background does not include any experience in higher education administration. He is the first Hispanic president of the university. As UNR president, Sandoval has pushed to expand enrollment to 25,000 students by 2030 in what he calls the "Wolf Pack Way".

Honors and awards
Sandoval has received the following awards and certificates: the Hispanics in Politics' 1996 "Broche de Oro Award"; the Anti-Defamation League's 2003 "Torch of Liberty Award;" the Nevada State Bar's 2004 "Access to Justice Public Lawyer Award;" The Latino Coalition's 2004 "Most Influential Hispanic in the U.S. Award"; and the 2004 University of Nevada "Alumnus of the Year Award."

Personal life
Sandoval married Kathleen Teipner in 1990. Along with Kathleen, the program director for the Children's Cabinet in Reno, Sandoval has three children. He and his wife announced their separation in 2017 and finalized their divorce in 2018, stating the demands of public life as the main reason. Sandoval remarried to Las Vegas gaming executive Lauralyn McCarthy on August 11, 2018.

Electoral history

See also
 Barack Obama Supreme Court candidates
 List of first minority male lawyers and judges in Nevada
 List of Hispanic/Latino American jurists
 List of minority governors and lieutenant governors in the United States

References

External links
 Nevada Governor Brian Sandoval official government website
 Brian Sandoval for Governor official 2014 campaign website
 
 
 
 Brian Sandoval profile in United States District Court for the District of Nevada's State of the Court 2006 report
 Brian Sandoval '89: Nevada's First Hispanic U.S. District Judge

|-

|-

|-

|-

|-

|-

|-

|-

|-

1963 births
20th-century American lawyers
21st-century American judges
21st-century American lawyers
20th-century American politicians
21st-century American politicians
American judges of Mexican descent
American politicians of Mexican descent
Members of American gaming commissions
Republican Party governors of Nevada
Hispanic and Latino American judges
Hispanic and Latino American state governors of the United States
Hispanic and Latino American state legislators in Nevada
Judges of the United States District Court for the District of Nevada
Living people
Republican Party members of the Nevada Assembly
Ohio State University Moritz College of Law alumni
Nevada Attorneys General
Nevada lawyers
People from Redding, California
Politicians from Carson City, Nevada
Politicians from Reno, Nevada
United States district court judges appointed by George W. Bush
University of Nevada, Reno alumni
University of Nevada, Reno faculty
Latino conservatism in the United States